Victoria Quay may refer to:

 Victoria Quay, Edinburgh, Scottish Government building in Leith, Edinburgh
 Victoria Quay, Fremantle, south side dock area of Fremantle harbour, in Fremantle, Western Australia
 Victoria Quay, Dublin quays

See also
 Victoria Harbour (disambiguation)
 Victoria Quays, Sheffield; canal terminus in Sheffield